Parafomoria fumanae is a moth of the family Nepticulidae. It is found in southern France and Spain.

There are at least two to three generations per year.

The larvae feed on Fumana procumbens. They mine the stems of their host plant.

External links
Fauna Europaea
Seven Nepticulidae new to the Iberian Peninsula and several new province records (Lepidoptera: Nepticulidae)

Nepticulidae
Moths of Europe
Moths described in 2005